Keneth may refer to:

 Saint Cenydd, a Welsh Saint of the Christian Church
 Trainee Keneth, a character from the game Suikoden IV
 Keneth Alden Simons (1913–2004), American electrical engineer

See also
 Kenneth